Dolunay (International title: Full Moon) is a Turkish drama series broadcast on Star TV. It premiered on the network from July 4 to December 31, 2017.

Series Synopsis 
Dolunay explores the theme of what makes a family a family. Is it blood and genetics, shared experiences, or simply love? Ferit Aslan is a smart and successful businessman and born leader who is disciplined in all areas of his life from work, to fitness, to health. He is particularly strict in regards to his home and those who work in it. Nazli Pinar is a young culinary student who is hired as Ferit’s private chef and must deal with his specific requirements and rules for preparing his meals. Outspoken, independent, and free-spirited, Nazli initially clashes with Ferit, but the two gradually form a friendship and flirtation. Nazli grows very close to Bulut, Ferit's young nephew. When tragedy strikes and Ferit must take responsibility for Bulut, a custody battle ensues with Demet and Hakan. Asuman's actions cause Ferit to lose the custody and Nazli is unable to confess this to Ferit. They grow closer, but he's furious upon learning the truth. However, he and Nazli agree to engage in a fabricated marital relationship to help his chances of gaining custody of Bulut. Things are complicated when Ferit's musician brother-in-law Deniz, falls in love with Nazli and Demet tries to use this to turn Deniz against Ferit. The core set of supporting characters are a mix of family and friends who are considered family who mostly help but sometimes hinder Ferit and Nazli’s relationship as it evolves from business to friendship and eventually, love.

Cast
Lead cast
 Özge Gürel as Nazmiye "Nazlı" Pınar Aslan. A young culinary student who aspires to own her own restaurant. She is often stressed due to being responsible for her younger troublemaker sister, Asuman. Ferit's wife
 Can Yaman as Ferit Aslan. A wealthy, handsome businessman in the public eye. He has a deep distrust of people (women in particular) and cannot forgive them due to catching his mother cheating as a child. Nazli's husband

Supporting cast
 Hakan Kurtaş as Deniz Kaya. Demet and Demir's Brother, Zeynep and (by extension) Ferit's brother-in-law and close friend. Unlike Ferit, he lives a carefree and unstructured life as a musician. He falls in love with Nazli upon meeting her, and his jealousy of Ferit begins to drive a wedge between them. He is very emotional and reckless.
 Necip Memili as Hakan Önder. Demet's husband, who has a personal vendetta against Ferit. He wishes to adopt Bulut in order to obtain shares in Pusula holding (Aslan and Kaya family's company). He is involved in illegal trafficking and is later abusive towards his wife.
 Öznur Serçeler as Fatoş Yalçın. Nazli's best friend and roommate. An aspiring but unemployed fashion designer, Fatoş pretends to be wealthy to ingratiate herself with Engin.
 Türkü Turan as Alya. Deniz's ex-girlfriend, who is a singer. She is still in love with Deniz and tries to win him back, but is constantly saddened to see his affection for Nazli. She tries to make him see that Nazli is in love with Ferit and comforts him during his heartbreak.
 İlayda Akdoğan as Asuman Pınar. Nazli's younger mischievous sister. She is a tourism student but often skips class to hang out with her friends. Aspiring to live like the rich, she accumulates debts and even resorts to shoplifting. Demet takes advantage of her need for money to sabotage Ferit.
 Berk Yaygın as Tarık. Ferit's assistant and driver. He and Fatoş bond over their mutual love for food, and he eventually falls in love with her.
 Balamir Emren as Engin. Ferit's best friend and business partner. He often is the one to point out things that Ferit refuses to admit to himself, such as his feelings for Nazli.
 Alara Bozbey as Demet Kaya Önder. Demir and Deniz's sister, Ferit's sister-in-law (by extension) and former fiancée. She is estranged from her family because she married Hakan against their wishes and has not spoken to any of them for years. She wishes to adopt Bulut because he is the only thing she has left of her brother, but her husband uses this to his monetary advantage by gaining control of the business.
 Alihan Türkdemir as Bulut Kaya, Demir and Zeynep's son. Ferit's nephew, whom he tries to adopt. He is very fond of Nazli and often tries to set her up with his uncle.
 Yeşim Gül Aksar as Leman Aslan. Ferit's mother who is estranged from him because she had an affair when he was a child.
 Irmak Ünal as Zeynep Aslan Kaya.(2 episodes) Ferit's sister, married to Demir Kaya, and Bulut's Mother.
 Mert Yavuzcan as Demir Kaya.(2 episodes) Ferit's Brother-in-law, married to Zeynep, and Bulut's Father.
 Özlem Türay as İkbal. Ferit's assistant.
 Ayumi Takano as Manami. Nazli's former Japanese instructor who becomes her business partner.
 Gamze Aydogdu as Melis, Bulut's nanny at Demet's house.
 Emre Kentmenoglu as Bekir. Hakan's henchman.
 Minel Üstüner as Pelin, Ferit's ex-girlfriend before his engagement to Demet.

Series overview

International broadcasting

References

External links

 
 

2017 Turkish television series debuts
Turkish drama television series
2017 Turkish television series endings
Star TV (Turkey) original programming
Television series produced in Istanbul
Television shows set in Istanbul
Television series set in the 2010s
Turkish television series endings